Columbia Area Transit (CAT), officially the Hood River County Transportation District, is a public transit agency serving Hood River County, Oregon, United States. It operates local bus routes in Hood River, as well as commuter bus routes to Portland, The Dalles, and other nearby communities. The "major" sources of funding include grants from the Federal Transit Administration, several different sources from the State of Oregon, local property tax, and user fees. The District was formed by a vote of Hood River County residents in 1992 and took effect July 1, 1993.

Columbia Gorge Express

The Columbia Gorge Express is an intercity bus route that Columbia Area Transit operates between Portland, Oregon, and Hood River, Oregon. The route originates at the Gateway/Northeast 99th Avenue Transit Center on the eastern edge of Portland and follows I-84 to Hood River. Intermediate stops are at Troutdale, Oregon, Multnomah Falls, and Cascade Locks, Oregon.

References

External links
Columbia Area Transit

1993 establishments in Oregon
Bus transportation in Oregon
Transit agencies in Oregon
Transportation in Hood River County, Oregon